The 1988 British Open was a professional ranking snooker tournament, that was held from 21 February to 6 March 1988 with television coverage beginning on 26 February at the Assembly Rooms in Derby, England.
 


Main draw

Final

References

British Open (snooker)
British Open
British Open
British Open
British Open